Vakhsh may refer to the following, all in southern Tajikistan :

places and jurisdictions 
 Vakhsh, Tajikistan city 
 Vakhsh District, surrounding it
 Vakhsh, Jayhun District, a village in Jayhun District
 Vakhsh Range
 Vakhsh (river)

other
 Vakhsh Qurghonteppa, football club from Qurghonteppa